Wilson Heredia (born March 30, 1972) is a former Major League Baseball pitcher who played two seasons with the Texas Rangers. He batted and threw right-handed.

Career
Heredia was signed by the Rangers as an amateur free agent prior to the 1990 season. He made his major league debut early in the  season, appearing in six games before being sent back down to the minor leagues. Later that season, he and Scott Podsednik were the "players to be named later" that the Rangers dealt to the Florida Marlins in exchange for Bobby Witt, and he spent the remainder of the 1995 season with the Double-A Portland Sea Dogs.

After the 1996 season the Rangers claimed him off waivers from the Marlins. He spent most of the  season with the Triple-A Oklahoma City 89ers before being called back up to the major league club that August. Heredia appeared in 10 games for the Rangers that season; his final major league game was on September 20, 1997 against the Anaheim Angels. The Rangers granted him free agency following the season.

Heredia spent 1998 in the New York Yankees minor-league system and 2000 playing for the independent Newark Bears before leaving American professional baseball at age 28.

External links

1972 births
Living people
Charlotte Rangers players
Columbus Clippers players
Dominican Republic expatriate baseball players in Italy
Dominican Republic expatriate baseball players in Mexico
Dominican Republic expatriate baseball players in the United States
Gastonia Rangers players
Grosseto Baseball Club players
Gulf Coast Rangers players
Major League Baseball players from the Dominican Republic
Major League Baseball pitchers
Mexican League baseball pitchers
Newark Bears players
Norwich Navigators players
Oklahoma City 89ers players
People from La Romana, Dominican Republic
Portland Sea Dogs players
Texas Rangers players
Tigres del México players
Tulsa Drillers players
Sinon Bulls players
Dominican Republic expatriate baseball players in Taiwan